The Mindoro black rat (Rattus mindorensis) is a species of rodent in the family Muridae.
It is found only in hilly and forested areas of Mindoro island, the Philippines.

References

Rattus
Rats of Asia
Endemic fauna of the Philippines
Fauna of Mindoro
Rodents of the Philippines
Mammals described in 1898
Taxa named by Oldfield Thomas
Taxonomy articles created by Polbot